The Concerto for Flute is a composition for solo flute and orchestra by the American composer Joan Tower.  The work was commissioned by the American Composers Orchestra and was composed in 1989.  It was first performed at Carnegie Hall on January 28, 1990, by the flutist Carol Wincenc and the American Composers Orchestra under the conductor Hugh Wolff.  The piece is dedicated to Carol Wincenc.

Composition
The Flute Concerto has a duration of roughly 15 minutes and is composed in one continuous movement.  Tower briefly described the piece in the score program notes, writing, "The 15-minute work starts with the low register of the flute alone before the orchestra comes. As the flute gets more active, the chamber-size orchestra provides competitive tension which is matched phrase by phrase as the piece heads relentlessly towards to a finale where the "music blows wide open" (Wincenc) in a virtuosic display of flute scales and arpeggios."

Instrumentation
The work is scored for solo flute and a small orchestra comprising an additional flute (doubling piccolo), oboe, clarinet (doubling bass clarinet), bassoon, trumpet, bass trombone, two percussionists, and strings.

Reception
The Flute Concerto has been praised by music critics.  Reviewing the world premiere, Bernard Holland of The New York Times wrote, "It is a one-movement work that makes a musical virtue of its technical cleverness. The flute's natural reticence in big formats is a problem met head on, not simply avoided by separating solo instrument from orchestra."  He added:
In a later review, Martin Bernheimer of the Financial Times similarly praised "the mad coloratura" of the piece.

References

Concertos by Joan Tower
1989 compositions
Tower
Music commissioned by the American Composers Orchestra